Amjad Abdullah Sulaiman Hidaib Al-Harthi (born 1 January 1994) is an Omani professional footballer who plays as a right-back for the Omani national team.

International career
Al-Harthi debuted internationally on 25 March 2021 in a friendly match against India in a 1–1 draw.

On 11 November 2021, he scored his first international goal in a 2022 FIFA World Cup qualifying match against China PR, which ended in a 1–1 draw. His goal came accidentally as the ball slightly bounced off his head from a corner by Mohsin Al-Khaldi before flying into the net. Al-Khaldi was on his way to scoring the second goal directly from a corner in his career, but the goal was awarded to Al-Harthi instead.

International goals

References

1994 births
Living people
Omani footballers
Oman international footballers
Association football defenders
Al-Seeb Club players